Those marked in bold have now been capped at full International level.

Group A

Head coach: Ernst Weber

Head coach: Hans Brun Larsen

Head coach: István Varga

Head coach: António José Batista De Sousa Violante

Group B

Head coach:

Head coach: Avraham Bakhar

Head coach: Antonio Rocca

Head coach: Juan Santisteban

Footnotes

UEFA European Under-17 Championship squads
Squads